Palace of Earthly Honour (，pinyin: yikungong) is one of the Six Western Palaces in the Forbidden City, which used to be a residence of imperial concubines. The palace is northern to Palace of Eternal Longevity, southern to Palace of Gathering Elegance, eastern to Palace of Eternal Spring, north-western to Hall of the Supreme Principle and south-western to Palace of Universal Happiness.

History 
Palace of Earthly Honour was built in 1420, like most of Western Palaces as Palace of Ten Thousand Peace (万安宫；pinyin: wan'an gong). In 1535, the palace was renamed as Palace of Earthly Honor (翊坤宫) by Jiajing Emperor. The current name of the palace corresponds with trigram "kun" ("earth") present in the name of Palace of Earthly Tranquility and means "assisting the ruler of earth". In a nutshell, the name of palace indicates the status of imperial consort being assistant empress. Paradoxally, the palace wasn't a residence exclusively reserved for highly ranking imperial consorts (noble consorts, imperial noble consorts and empresses). 

In 1885, the palace was connected with Chuxiu palace, a residence of Empress Dowager Cixi and was used as a place for Elegant Women Selection in 1889.

Accidents 
On 4 May 2013, an armed man broke into the main hall through window. During the breakdown, the Qing dynasty brass-plated gilded flowery chime (made in Great Britain in XVIII century) fell down from a table. A craftsman working in the Palace Museum was controlling that man for 15 seconds. Thereafter, the glass window was substituted, and the gilded flowery chime was sent to a storage for an expertise.

Residents

Ming Dynasty

Qing Dynasty

References 
Architecture in China

Forbidden City